The Pashtun diaspora comprises all ethnic Pashtuns and their descendants who are living outside of their traditional homeland of Pashtunistan (or Pakhtunistan), a historic region that is today situated over parts of Afghanistan and Pakistan. While Pashtunistan is home to the majority of Pashtun people, there are significant local Pashtun diaspora communities scattered across the neighbouring Pakistani provinces of Sindh and Punjab, particularly in their respective provincial capital cities of Karachi and Lahore. Additionally, people with Pashtun ancestry are also found across India; particularly in Rohilkhand, a region in the Indian state of Uttar Pradesh; and in the Indian states of Gujarat and Rajasthan. Outside of South Asia, significant Pashtun diaspora communities are found in the Arab states of the Persian Gulf (primarily in the United Arab Emirates), the United States, the United Kingdom, Germany, Iran, Australia, Canada, and Russia.

The Pashtun people, who are classified as an Iranian ethnolinguistic group, are believed to have settled in the traditional Pashtunistan region around the early . According to Ethnologue, the total Pashtun population currently stands at around 50 million, but some sources give slightly lower or higher figures. Among Indic communities in the Indian subcontinent, Pashtuns are commonly referred to by the word .

Native land

Afghanistan 

The ethnonym Afghan (of Persian origin) has been historically used since the 3rd century AD to refer to the Pashtuns, and is now used to describe every citizen of Afghanistan. Pashtuns make up the largest ethnic group in Afghanistan, comprising 46-65% of the total Afghan population. Approximately 2 million Afghan refugees live in neighboring Pakistan. The majority of them are Pashtuns who were born in that country.  

The Pashtuns are scattered all over Afghanistan, they can be found in almost every province of the country. Kandahar is the second largest city in Afghanistan and a stronghold of the Pashtun culture. The city of Lashkargah in the south, Farah in the west, Jalalabad in the east, and Kunduz in the north are other prominent cultural centres whose populations are predominantly Pashtun.

Pakistan 

Most Pashtuns are based in Pakistan. Pashtuns are one of the largest ethnic minority in Pakistan, making up 18% of the total population of Pakistan. Pashtuns form the majority ethnic group in the province of Khyber Pakhtunkhwa including tribal areas, and northern Balochistan.

With as many as 8.5 million by some estimates, the city of Karachi in Sindh Province hosts the largest concentration of urban Pashtuns population in the world Some important Pashtun cities of Pakistan include: Peshawar, Quetta, Zhob, Loralai, Killa Saifullah, Attock, Swat, Mardan, Charsada, Mingora, Bannu, Parachinar, and Swabi. The province of Baluchistan is although named after the Baloch, but Pashtuns are the majority here and the largest minority are the Baloch in the Balochistan province. However most of the land of Baluchistan is covered by Balochs and Brahuis while Pashtuns are concentrated in the north of the province.

Pashtuns make up 60-70% of total population of Hazara Division of Khyber Pakhtunkhwa. In Battagram Torghar District & Mansehra Pashtun Tribes speak Pushto language while Jadoons, Tareens and Dilazaks of Abbottabad & Haripur District speak Hindko language and sometimes Pashto as the second language.

The following outlines the Pashtun population in the provinces of Pakistan:

Smaller Pashtun communities outside Khyber Pakhtunkhwa and Balochistan can be found in the districts of Attock and Mianwali in Punjab. These and other communities of Pashtun ancestry who have long-settled in Punjab and Sindh region are often referred to as the Pathans. There are also large communities of Pathans such as Niazi and others who live in Khanewal, Kasur; and other larger communities have settled around Multan which was formerly part of the Durrani Empire. Pathan communities live in different district of Azad Kashmir.There, they are mainly settled in the districts of Poonch, Sudhnuti and Bagh. In Poonch and Sudhnuti they constitute more than 70% of the population. Kashmiri Pashtuns mainly consist of the Sadozai tribe, which is locally known as Sudhan. Approximate population of Sadozais in AJK is 1 million. Sadozai tribe has a strong hold in Rawalakot city in Azad Kashmir. A small number of other pashtun tribes in Kashmir which include Durrani, Tareen, Lodhi, Yousafzai Shinwary and Afridi tribes which extends from Azad Kashmir to India's Jammu and Kashmir. They speak local languages.

In addition to this, some Urdu-speaking communities in Pakistan trace their ancestry to the ancient Pashtun regions of Afghanistan and Khyber Pakhtunkhawa. Some identify themselves as Bangash, Yousefzai, Ghouri and Durrani. Additionally, a significant number of descendants of Rohillas migrated to Pakistan after the partition of India in 1947. The Pashtuns make up 30% of the Muhajir community in Karachi.

Notable people

India 

India, In Rohilkhand, they made large settlements subsequent to 14th century and prior to the 20th century. In fact, according to the 1911 edition of Encyclopædia Britannica, the number of Pashtuns in British India was nearly 3.5 million, but the speakers of Pashto numbered less than 1.25 million. Most of this population was allotted, along with its respective provinces, to Pakistan after the partition of India in 1947. Today the Pashtuns in India can be divided into those who speak Pashto and those who speak Urdu/Hindi and other regional languages, the Urdu/Hindi speaking group being the biggest. Khan Mohammad Atif, a professor at the University of Lucknow, estimates that "The population of Pathans in India is twice their population in Afghanistan".

Pashto-speaking communities 

There are many Pashto-speaking Pakhtuns in the Indian state of Jammu and Kashmir. Although their exact numbers are hard to determine, it is at least in excess of 100,000 for it is known that in 1954 over 100,000 nomadic Pakhtuns living in Kashmir Valley were granted Indian
citizenship. Today jirgas are frequently held. Those settled and living in the Kashmir Valley speak Pashto, and are found chiefly in the southwest of the valley, where Pashtun colonies have from time to time been founded. The most interesting are the Kukikhel Afridis of Dramghaihama, who retain all the old customs and speak Pashto. They wear colorful dress and carry swords and shields. The Afridis and the Machipurians, who belong to the Yusufzai tribe, are liable to military service, in return for which they hold certain villages free of revenue. The Pashtuns chiefly came in under the Durranis, but many were brought by Maharajah Gulab Singh for service on the frontier. Pashto is also spoken in two villages, Dhakki and Changnar (Chaknot), located on the Line of Control in Kupwara District. In response to demand by the Pashtun community living in the state, Kashir TV has recently launched a series of Pushto-language programs.

A further small, scattered Pashtun population still exists in some major cities of India with large Muslim populations, with the majority of Pashto-speaking individuals residing in the states of Delhi and Uttar Pradesh India; who also have adopted local languages of the respective areas they live in, as their second language. These Pathans, numbering around 14,161, have retained the use of the Pashto language and are still able to speak and understand it. This is partially because until recently, most of these Indian Pashtuns were able to travel to Pakhtunkhwa, Pakistan.

A small Hindu community, known as the Sheen Khalai meaning 'blue skinned' (referring to the color of Pashtun women's facial tattoos), migrated to Unniara, Rajasthan, India after partition. Prior to 1947, the community resided in the Quetta, Loralai and Maikhter regions of the British Indian province of Baluchistan. Today, they continue to speak Pashto and celebrate Pashtun culture through the Attan dance.

Urdu and Hindi speaking communities 
The larger number of people claiming Pashtun ancestry in India are Urdu speaking. Despite the loss of most of the Raj-era Pashtun population, India still has a community of Hindustani speakers who can trace some of their ancestry to ancient Pashtun settlers. They are often referred by the Hindustani pronunciation of the word Pashtun, "Pathan".

Major Indian Pathan tribes lived in the following areas. While many persons belonging to these tribes moved to the Afghan-Pakistan border, others chose to stay and thus, descendants of these tribes still reside in the parts of India listed below:

Pashtuns in the Middle East 

Hundreds of thousands of Pashtuns serving as migrant workers reside in the Middle East, particularly in the United Arab Emirates, Saudi Arabia, Qatar, Kuwait, Oman and other Arab countries. Many of them are involved in the transport business, while others are employees of construction companies.

There were over 100,000 Pashtuns living in Iran in 1993. The Pashtuns there are mainly concentrated in the Afghan-Iran border, in the Khorasan Province of Iran. The settling of Pashtuns in Iran goes back to the 18th century during the Durrani reign. Timur Shah Durrani, an ethnic Pashtun, the son of Ahmad Shah Durrani and King of Afghanistan, was born in Mashhad, in the Khorasan province of Iran, which was part of the Durrani empire at that time.

About 300,000 Pashtuns migrated to the Persian Gulf countries between 1976 and 1981, representing 35% of Pakistani immigrants.

Pashtuns in Europe 

Many Pashtuns have migrated from their homeland in South/Central Asia to Europe.

United Kingdom 

The United Kingdom is home to some 100,000 Pashtuns, making it one of the most populous overseas Pashtun communities in the world and the most populous one in the West. Pashtun diaspora in UK have made their presence felt through their restaurants with traditional names like Bab-eKhyber, Hujra, Kabuli pulao etc. and Music. Its one of the most vibrant Pashtun diaspora in the west.

Pashtuns in other parts of the world

United States 

Pashtuns have been present in California at least since agricultural labor was imported in the early 20th century. Since the late 1970s and onwards, Pashtuns began immigrating to the USA in large numbers and are well established there. Pashtuns in the United States are famous for running top Afghan cuisine restaurants and as owners of the fast-food restaurant chain Kennedy Fried Chicken that is based in New York City.

Canada 

1,690 persons characterized their ethnicity as "Pashtun" in Canada's 2006 census. However, in question 17 of Canada's Statcan census form most Pashtuns don't put their ethnicity as Pashtuns but rather Afghan or Pakistani.

Australia 

In the latter part of the 19th century several thousand men from Afghanistan, Baluchistan, Kashmir, Sind, Rajasthan, Egypt, Persia, Turkey and Punjab, but collectively known as "Afghans", were recruited during the initial British development of the Australian Outback, especially for the operation of camel trains in desert areas. These consisted of men who were not allowed to bring their families with them, many married local Aborigines and are now known as Ghans. During the 1980s and 90s, Pashtuns began settling in Perth, Melbourne, Sydney and other major cities of Australia.

Bangladesh and Sri Lanka 

Pashtuns in Bangladesh are descendants of Pashtun emigrants who settled into Bangladesh during the Pathan rule of the Bengal Sultanate under the Karrani dynasty. Additional Pashtun communities of South Asia are also the Pathans of Sri Lanka, who are believed to have origins from Pathans who settled in Batticaloa, initially arriving for trade.

Southeast Asia 

Since the early 1900s there have been many generations of Pashtuns who migrated from Afghanistan, Pakistan and the tribal areas of Pakistan (Khyber Pakhtunkhwa). Pashtun settlements in Thailand have been common throughout the provinces. There is even a Thai-Pashtun Friendship Association. The Pashtuns are fiercely independent, as a result they often are well treated and respected by the Thai locals. Countries like Indonesia, Singapore, Brunei and Malaysia also have similar cases of Pashtun settlements, which those who are of descent are quickly assimilated to the local Indian ethnic minority community while those recent migrants or settlers belong to the Pakistani diaspora, since most of the migrants came from Pakistan.

East Asia 
There may be some Pashtun communities living in parts of China, Taiwan and Japan.

Guyana and Suriname 

Some people living in Guyana and Suriname claim to be of Afghan descent. Most of them moved to South American countries during the Indian immigration.

Latin America 

Many Pashtuns from Afghanistan came to Argentina, Brazil, Chile, Panama, Colombia, Paraguay and Peru as refugees during the Soviet invasion of Afghanistan in 1981 and during the internal Afghan conflicts in 1995–1996.

See also 
 Pathans of Punjab
 Pathans of Rajasthan
 Pashtun people
 Pashtun tribes
 Pashtun culture
 Pashtunistan
 Pakhtunkhwa
 Rohilkhand
 Rohilla

References

Bibliography 
 Ahmad, Aisha; Roger Boase. Pashtun Tales from the Pakistan-Afghan Frontier: From the Pakistan-Afghan Frontier. Saqi Books, 2003. .
 Ahmed, Akbar S. 1976. Millennium and charisma among Pathans: a critical essay in social anthropology. Routledge & Kegan Paul, 1980. .
 Ahmed, Akbar S. Pukhtun economy and society: traditional structure and economic development in a tribal society. Routledge & Kegan Paul, 1980. .
 Caroe, Olaf. The Pathans: 500 B.C.-A.D. 1957. MacMillan, 1964. .
 Dani, Ahmad Hasan. Peshawar: Historic city of the Frontier. Khyber Mail Press, 1969. .
Docherty, Paddy. The Khyber Pass: A History of Empire and Invasion. Union Square Press, 2008. .
 Dupree, Louis. Afghanistan. Princeton University Press, 1973. .
 Elphinstone, Mountstuart (1815). An account of the kingdom of Caubul, and its dependencies in Persia, Tartary, and India: comprising a view of the Afghaun nation, and a history of the Dooraunee monarchy. Longman, Hurst, Rees, Orme and Brown, 1815.
 Habibi, Abdul Hai. Afghanistan: An Abridged History. Fenestra Books, 2003. .
Hopkirk, Peter. The Great Game: the struggle for empire in central Asia Kodansha Globe; Reprint edition. Kodansha International, 1994. .
 Nichols, Robert. A history of Pashtun migration, 1775–2006. Oxford University Press, 2008. .
 Vogelsang, Willem. The Afghans. Wiley-Blackwell, 2002. .
 Wardak, Ali. Jirga – A Traditional Mechanism of Conflict Resolution in Afghanistan, 2003, online at UNPAN (the United Nations Online Network in Public Administration and Finance).
 Weiner, Myron; Ali Banuazizi. The Politics of social transformation in Afghanistan, Iran, and Pakistan. Syracuse University Press, 1994. .
 Weinreich, Matthias. "We are here to stay": Pashtun migrants in the Northern Areas of Pakistan. Klaus Schwarz, 2009. .

 
Pakistani diaspora